Opal Irene Whiteley (December 11, 1897 – February 16, 1992) was an American nature writer and diarist whose childhood journal was first published in 1920 as The Story of Opal in serialized form in the Atlantic Monthly, then later that same year as a book with the title The Story of Opal: The Journal of an Understanding Heart. It gave Whiteley celebrity status in her home state of Oregon, where she toured giving lectures on nature and the environment.

She lived her later life in England, where she committed herself to a psychiatric hospital in 1948; she spent the remainder of her life in psychiatric care until her death in 1992. Whiteley's true origins and the veracity of her diary were disputed during her lifetime, and continue to be questioned today.

Biography
Whiteley apocryphally claimed to be the daughter of Henri, Prince of Orléans, who died unmarried in 1901. According to Whiteley, she was taken to Oregon in 1904 and brought to a lumber camp, where she was adopted by Ed and Lizzie Whiteley. While Opal Whiteley used several names during her lifetime, the one she preferred was Françoise Marie de Bourbon-Orléans. Family members claim that Opal was born in Colton, Washington, the first of five children. In 1903, after having spent almost a year in Wendling, Oregon, the Whiteley family moved to Walden, Oregon, near the town of Cottage Grove. Whiteley grew up in small towns near various lumber camps, usually in poverty.

Whiteley claimed that her mother often disciplined her with severe corporal punishment. Whiteley's diary includes many accounts of punishment by "the mamma". The negative portrait of her mother caused Whiteley to become estranged from her family, particularly since the other children claimed they were never abused. However, Opal's grandmother Mary Ann Scott confirmed that she frequently beat Opal for "looking at nothing with big eyes ... inattention and absentmindedness."

Biographers have confirmed that at an early age, Whiteley was a noted amateur naturalist and a child prodigy who was able to memorize and categorize vast amounts of information on plants and animals. One of her schoolteachers, Lily Black, felt that Whiteley was a genius; she was two grades ahead of her age in school, and Black took advantage of the then-new interlibrary loan system to get books for Whiteley from the Oregon State Library. In 1915 newspaper editor Elbert Bede began a series of articles in The Cottage Grove Sentinel about her, filled with glowing praise.

Whiteley attended the University of Oregon, beginning in 1916. When her mother and grandfather died, she moved out and began supporting herself solely through lectures she would give throughout the state.

After the publication of her diary, she self-published a book of her poetry entitled The Flower of Stars in 1923, the same year as her book The Fairyland Around Us, which she had originally intended to have published by Ellery Sedgewick, who instead had published her diaries.

Whiteley traveled to India in the 1920s as her supposed biological father had done: she was the guest of the Maharaja of Udaipur, and wrote several articles about India for British magazines.  Her presence caused some trouble with the British government in India, especially when a local cleric fell in love with her. Leaving India, she eventually settled in London. She grew increasingly disturbed, and was often in dire poverty. She was committed to Napsbury Hospital, where she was known to the staff of Napsbury as "the Princess", and visitors remarked that she behaved like one. Whiteley remained at Napsbury until her death. According to the Guide to the Opal Whiteley Papers, she was buried at Highgate Cemetery, where her gravestone bears both her names with the inscription "I spake as a child".

Writing
According to Whiteley and her grandmother, as a child Whiteley was usually punished for daydreaming and "meditations", for running away to go on "explores" instead of working, for misguided attempts to help around the house that ended in disaster, and especially the time and effort she spent on caring for the animals around the lumber camp. She had a great many animal friends, both wild and domestic, to whom she gave fanciful names derived from her readings in classical literature. Despite her troubles, Whiteley wrote of her childhood as though she had often been very happy: even after a severe beating, she could write: "I'm real glad I'm alive."

As a teenager, Whiteley joined the Young People's Society of Christian Endeavour and rose to the position of State Superintendent. She began tutoring local children and young adults in natural history. She became famous throughout the region as the "Sunshine Fairy" and gave numerous lectures on geology and natural history.

Diary

Whiteley attempted to self-publish a textbook in 1920, titled The Fairyland Around Us, which was developed from her popular talks on the natural world. Unfortunately, she ran out of money for Fairyland and was only able to send a limited number of copies to subscribers.  She then went in search of a commercial publisher, without success.  However, in a meeting with Ellery Sedgwick, publisher of the Atlantic Monthly, she arranged to publish her childhood diary instead, which, if authentic, would have been written c. 1903-4.

According to Sedgwick in the foreword to the published diary, Whiteley brought in Fairyland, and when asked about her background, her detailed memory led Sedgwick to ask if she had kept a diary. When she replied that she had, but it was torn to pieces, Sedgwick requested that she reassemble it. However, one of Whiteley's biographers uncovered a letter from Whiteley to Sedgwick in which she requests an appointment with him and describes having kept accounts of her observations of the natural world from a very early age. If true, Sedgwick may have partially invented the tale of how Whiteley's diary came to his attention. Sedgwick claimed that Everett Baker, an attorney and head of the Christian Endeavour organization in Oregon, wrote a letter to him that said that on two occasions Whiteley's mother admitted to him and his wife that Whiteley was adopted.

Photos that initially appeared in The Story of Opal showed Whiteley at work on the reconstruction and pictures of two of the diary pages. The diary was apparently block-printed in crayon and phonetically spelled on various types of paper. According to Sedgwick's account of the reconstruction, it was a laborious undertaking, as many of the torn pieces were only large enough to contain a single letter and the pieces had been stored in a hat box for years.

Authenticity disputes
Disputes over the authenticity of Whiteley's diary began shortly after their publication in 1920, with many alleging she had actually written the diary at age 20. Benjamin Hoff based much of his argument for authenticity on the premise that it would have been an extraordinarily elaborate deception for the adult Whiteley to first create a diary as a child might have printed it, then tear it up, store it and reassemble it for Sedgwick and the Atlantic Monthly. Furthermore, he indicated that he had examined some of the few remaining diary pages and that chemical tests of the crayon markings showed that the crayons were manufactured prior to World War I.  This claim was initially made in Opal Whiteley, The Unsolved Mystery by Lawrence, who said she had had the diary pages submitted for scientific scrutiny.

Some claim that she fabricated the diary to gain publicity and that she had a mental illness (possibly schizophrenia) that led her to engage in fantasies about her "true" parents.

Adaptations of diary 
The diary was reprinted in 1962 with a lengthy foreword by E. S. Bradburne (Elizabeth Lawrence), as Opal Whiteley, the Unsolved Mystery.  It was reprinted in 1986 with a biography and foreword by Benjamin Hoff, and again, with a new afterword, in 1994. Lawrence's version has been reissued in an expanded edition as Opal Whiteley, the Mystery Continues.

Hoff's reprint of the journal contains a detailed account of his research into Opal's life and the origins of her diary, and supplies evidence that concludes that the diary was authentically created in childhood, but he disbelieved Whiteley's claims of her adoption.

Though the U S copyright of her diary has lapsed, the international copyright is still extant and is held by the library of the University of London.  The full dramatic rights to the diary are held by Robert Lindsey-Nassif, author of the Off-Broadway musical Opal, which won the Richard Rodgers and AT&T Awards.

In 1984 an adaptation of her diary was published by Jane Boulton as Opal: The Journal of an Understanding Heart.

The diary was adapted into an Off-Broadway musical by Robert Lindsey-Nassif, opening in New York in 1992, published by Samuel French, Inc.

Children's author and illustrator Barbara Cooney published "Only Opal: The Diary of a Young Girl," using text from Jane Boulton's "Opal: The Journal of an Understanding Heart," in 1994, via Philomel Books, a division of The Putnam & Grosset Group.

Only several original copies of Opal's book, The Fairyland Around Us, are known to exist.

Author Peter Rock indicates Opal Whiteley's nature diaries as an inspiration for his 2009 novel My Abandonment, quoting her in the opening page. Rock's novel tells the story of a father and daughter living in an Oregon nature preserve.

In March 2010 Oregon Public Broadcasting aired in-house documentary Oregon Experience: Opal Whiteley.

Opal, a narrative feature film inspired by the life of Opal Whiteley and directed by Dina Ciraulo, premiered in the 2010 Mill Valley Film Festival. It had a week-long theatrical run at the Bijou Art Cinemas in Eugene, Oregon.

In Jerry Rust's 2011 novel The Covered Bridge Murders, Opal Whiteley is featured as a character in the plot.

References

External links 
 
 
Transcript of the diary with additional resources, from the University of Oregon
The Fairyland Around Us

American naturalists
American diarists
1897 births
1992 deaths
Writers from Oregon
People from Lane County, Oregon
People with mental disorders
Burials at Highgate Cemetery
University of Oregon alumni
American Book Award winners
People from Colton, Washington
20th-century naturalists
20th-century diarists